The Verse of Purification (Arabic:آية التطهير) refers to verse 33:33 of the Quran about the status of purity of the Ahl al-Bayt. The last passage of this verse reads:

Muslims disagree as to who belongs to the Ahl al-Bayt and what political privileges or responsibilities they have. Shia Islam limits the Ahl al-Bayt to the Islamic prophet Muhammad, his daughter Fatima, her husband Ali, and their two sons, Hasan and Husayn. There are various views in Sunni Islam, though a typical compromise is to include also Muhammad's wives in the Ahl al-Bayt. The Verse of Purification is regarded by the Shia as evidence of the infallibility of the Ahl al-Bayt.

What is ? 
According to Nasr et al., (spiritual) defilement encompasses all evil deeds and false beliefs that arise from the "sickness of the heart," another Quranic expression that appears for instance in verse 9:125. The Verse of Purification can thus be interpreted as God’s wanting to remove any incorrect action or belief from the Ahl al-Bayt and to provide them with infallibility, that is, the innate protection against all false beliefs or evil deeds.  is viewed as a God-given consciousness that overrides all other human faculties.

Shia view 
The Shia al-Tusi notes that the article  in the Verse of Purification grammatically limits the verse to the Ahl al-Bayt. He then argues that  here cannot be limited to disobedience because God expects obedience from every responsible person and not just the Ahl al-Bayt. The verse must therefore refer to the infallibility of the Ahl al-Bayt.   

The argument of the Shia Sharif al-Murtaza is similar. He argues that God's desire in the Verse of Purification cannot be a mere desire because God desires the spiritual purification of every responsible person. Therefore, God's desire in this verse must have been followed by action, that is, the action of purifying the Ahl al-Bayt and ensuring their infallibility. Another argument in this vein is presented by the Shia Sobhani.

Who are the Ahl al-Bayt?

Inclusion of the Ahl al-Kisa 
The majority of the traditions quoted by al-Tabari in his exegesis identify the Ahl al-Bayt with the Ahl al-Kisa, namely, Muhammad, Ali, Fatima, Hasan, and Husayn. These traditions are also cited by some other early Sunni authorities, including Ahmad ibn Hanbal, al-Suyuti, al-Hafiz al-Kabir, and Ibn Kathir. Similarly, the canonical Sunni collection Sunnan al-Tirmidhi holds that Muhammad limited the Ahl al-Bayt to Ali, Fatima, and their two sons when the Verse of Purification was revealed to him.

Muhammad's wife Umm Salama relates in (possibly the earliest version of) the Hadith al-Kisa that Muhammad gathered Ali, Fatima, Hasan, and Husayn under his cloak and prayed, "O God, these are my  and my closest family members; remove defilement from them and purify them completely." The accounts of the Sunni Ibn Kathir and al-Suyuti and the Shia Tabatabai continue that Umm Salama asked Muhammad, "Am I with thee, O Messenger of God?" but received the negative response, "Thou shalt obtain good. Thou shalt obtain good." There exists a version of this hadith in Sunni sources where Umm Salama is also included in the Ahl al-Bayt. In another Sunni version, Muhammad's servant Wathila bint al-Asqa' is counted in the Ahl al-Bayt.

Muhammad is said to have recited the last passage of the Verse of Purification every morning when he passed by Fatima's house to remind her household of the  prayer. In the Event of Mubahala, Muhammad is also believed to have gathered Ali, Fatima, and their two sons under his cloak and referred to them as the Ahl al-Bayt, according to Shia and some Sunni sources, including the canonical Sahih Muslim and Sunan al-Tirmidhi.

This makeup of the Ahl al-Bayt is echoed by Veccia Vaglieri and unanimously reported in Shia sources. In Shia theology works, the Ahl al-Bayt often also includes the remaining Shia Imams. The term is sometimes loosely applied in Shia writings to all descendants of Ali and Fatima.

Inclusion of Muhammad's wives 
Possibly because the earlier injunctions in the Verse of Purification are addressed at Muhammad's wives, some Sunni authors (such as al-Wahidi) have exclusively interpreted Ahl al-Bayt as Muhammad's wives. Others have noted that the last passage of this verse is grammatically inconsistent with the previous injunctions (masculine plural versus feminine plural pronouns). Thus the Ahl al-Bayt is not or is not limited to Muhammad's wives. Ibn Kathir, for instance, also includes Ali, Fatima, and their two sons.

Some Sunni hadiths, including some by Ibn Abbas and Ikrima, support the inclusion of Muhammad's wives in the Ahl al-Bayt. Alternatively, Leaman holds that marriage to a prophet does not guarantee inclusion in his . He argues that, in verse 11:73,  Sara is included in Abraham's  only after receiving the news of her imminent motherhood to two prophets, Isaac and Jacob.

In support of their bid for inclusion in the Ahl al-Bayt, the Abbasids argued that women, noble and holy as they may be, could not be considered a source of pedigree. They also claimed that Muhammad's paternal uncle Abbas was equal to the father after the death of Muhammad's father.

Broader interpretations 
As hinted above, some Sunni authors have broadened the application of the term to include in the Ahl al-Bayt the clan of Muhammad (Banu Hashim), the Banu Muttalib, the descendants of Muhammad's uncle Abbas (Abbasids), and even the descendants of Hashim's nephew Umayya (Umayyads). In particular, there exists an Abbasid version of the Hadith al-Kisa in Sunni sources that might be intended to strengthen Abbasid claims to inclusion among the Ahl al-Bayt. This assertion was in turn the cornerstone of Abbasid claims to the caliphate. Similarly, a Sunni version of the Hadith al-Thaqalayn identifies the Ahl al-Bayt with the descendants of Ali and his brothers (Aqil and Jafar), and Muhammad's uncle, Abbas. 

Abu Bakr and Umar have also been included by some in the Ahl al-Bayt by their supporters as they were both fathers-in-law of Muhammad. These and the accounts about the inclusion of the Umayyads in the Ahl al-Bayt might have been later reactions to Abbasid claims to inclusion in the Ahl al-Bayt and their bid for legitimacy, according to Brunner. The term has also been interpreted as the tribe of Quraysh or the whole Muslim community by some. For instance, Paret identified  in the Verse of Purification with Kaaba, though his theory has found few supporters, notably Sharon.

Conclusion 
According to Howard, a typical Sunni compromise is to interpret Ahl al-Bayt as the Ahl al-Kisa (Muhammad, Ali, Fatima, Hasan, Husayn) together with Muhammad's wives, which might reflect the majority opinion of medieval Sunni exegetes. This view is shared by Goldziher and his coauthors, and mentioned by Sharon, though Madelung also includes the Banu Hashim in the Ahl al-Bayt in view of their blood relation to Muhammad. 
In contrast, Shia limits the Ahl al-Bayt to Muhammad, Ali, Fatima, Hasan, and Husayn, pointing to authentic traditions that can be found in Sunni and Shia sources. Their view is supported by Veccia Vaglieri and Jafri.

Significance in Shia Islam 

The Verse of Purification has long been regarded by the Shia as evidence of the infallibility of the Ahl al-Bayt. As quoted by Madelung, Hasan ibn Ali referred to verse 33:33 in his inaugural speech as the caliph after the assassination of his father in 661:Infallibility is considered in Twelver Shia a necessary trait for the Imams, as the divine guides after the prophet. In addition to logical arguments, the textual basis for the infallibility of the Imams includes the Quranic verse, "My covenant embraceth not the evildoers." This notion was included in Shia teachings as early as the Shia Imam Muhammad al-Baqir.

See also

Notes

Sources
 
 
 
 
 
 
 
 
 
 
 
 
 

 
 
 
 
 
 

Quranic verses
Islamic ethics
Shia Islam
Sunni Islam
Sharia